Fieldia is a genus of flowering plants in the family Gesneriaceae, native to New South Wales, Queensland and Victoria in Australia. It has at times been treated as monotypic, with one species, F. australis. Two are accepted  by sources that include Lenbrassia in Fieldia.

Species
, the genus contains two accepted species:
Fieldia australiana (C.T.White) B.L.Burtt, synonym Lenbrassia australiana
Fieldia australis A.Cunn.

References

Gesnerioideae
Gesneriaceae genera